Basil Bernard Bernstein (1 November 1924 – 24 September 2000) was a British sociologist known for his work in the sociology of education. He worked on socio-linguistics and the connection between the manner of speaking and social organization.

Biography
Bernstein was born on 1 November 1924, into a Jewish immigrant family, in the East End of London. After teaching and doing social work for a time, in 1960 Bernstein began graduate work. He enrolled at University College London, where he completed his PhD in linguistics. He then moved to the Institute of Education at the University of London where he worked the remainder of his career. He became Karl Mannheim Chair of the Sociology of Education, Institute of Education.

On 4 June 1983, Bernstein was awarded the honorary degree "Doctor of the University" by the Open University (Milton Keynes, England).

Theory of language code 
Bernstein made a significant contribution to the study of communication with his sociolinguistic theory of language codes, which was developed to explain inequalities based on social class as found in language use. The theory holds that there are elaborated and restricted codes within the broader category of language codes.

The term code, as defined by Stephen Littlejohn in Theories of Human Communication (2002), "refers to a set of organizing principles behind the language employed by members of a social group"  (2002) suggests that Bernstein's theory shows how the language people use in everyday conversation both reflects and shapes the assumptions of a certain social group. Furthermore, relationships established within the social group affect the way that group uses language, and the type of speech that is used. Language, for Bernstein, is critical since it serves as the intermediary of social structure in the general theory of cultural transmission.

The construct of restricted and elaborated language codes was introduced by Bernstein in the 1960s. As an educator, he was interested in accounting for the relatively poor performance of working-class students in language-based subjects, when they were achieving scores as high as their middle-class counterparts on mathematical topics. In his theory, Bernstein asserts a direct relationship between societal class and language.

According to Bernstein in Class, Codes and Control (1971):

Forms of spoken language in the process of their learning initiate, generalize and reinforce special types of relationship with the environment and thus create for the individual particular forms of significance (p.76).That is to say that the way language is used within a particular societal class affects the way people assign significance and meaning to the things about which they are speaking. Littlejohn (2002) agrees and states, "people learn their place in the world by virtue of the language codes they employ" (p. 178). The code that a person uses indeed symbolizes their social identity (Bernstein, 1971).

The most extended empirical examination of Bernstein's code theory was a 10-year project conducted at Macquarie University by Ruqaiya Hasan. Hasan collected data from everyday contexts of interaction between mothers and children across two social locations, designated 'higher autonomy professionals' (families where the main breadwinner had considerable autonomy over their working day) and 'lower autonomy professionals' (families where the main breadwinner had no or very little autonomy with respect to their working day). Hasan found significant differences in the ways these families interacted, and showed, contra William Labov, the existence of 'semantic variation' – that is, different ways of saying with consequences for different ways of meaning. She argues it was these differences in orientation to relevance that explained the differences in educational achievements between middle and working class children first noted by Bernstein in the 1970s.

Elaborated code and restricted code
The two types of language codes are the elaborated code and the restricted code. The restricted code is suitable for insiders who share assumptions and understanding on the topic, whereas the elaborated code does not assume that the listener shares these assumptions or understandings, and thus elaborated code is more explicit, more thorough, and does not require the listener to read between the lines. According to Atherton (2002),

the essence of the distinction is in what the language is suited for. The restricted code works better than the elaborated code for situations in which there is a great deal of shared and taken-for-granted knowledge in the group of speakers. It is economical and rich, conveying a vast amount of meaning with a few words, each of which has a complex set of connotations and acts like an index, pointing the hearer to a lot more information which remains unsaid.

Within the restricted code, speakers draw on background knowledge and shared understanding. This type of code creates a sense of inclusion, a feeling of belonging to a certain group. Restricted codes can be found among friends and families and other intimately knit groups.

Conversely, according to Atherton (2002), “the elaborated code spells everything out, not because it is better, but because it is necessary so that everyone can understand it. It has to elaborate because the circumstances do not allow the speaker to condense.” The elaborated code works well in situations where there is no prior or shared understanding and knowledge, where more thorough explanation is required. If one is saying something new to someone they've never met before, they would most certainly communicate in elaborated code.

In differentiating between restricted and elaborated codes, it is noted that elaborated code can “stand on its own”, it is complete and full of detail, most overhearing a conversation would be able to understand it. However, restricted code is shorter, condensed and requires background information and prior knowledge. A person overhearing a conversation full of restricted code would be quite lost. It would be easily identifiable as an “insiders'” conversation. According to Bernstein (1971), “Clearly one code is not better than another; each possesses its own aesthetic, its own possibilities. Society, however, may place different values on the orders of experience elicited, maintained and progressively strengthened through the different coding systems” (p. 135).

As communication occurs in groups and either the elaborated or restricted code is used, there is a degree of openness that is noticed. There is both the closed-role system and the open-role system. In a closed-role system, roles are set and people are viewed in terms of these roles, as well as expected to act in accordance with their role. In an open-role system, roles are not set or simple, they are fluid and changeable (Littlejohn, 2002).

There are two factors which contribute to the development of either an elaborated or restricted code within a system. They are: the nature of the socialising agencies (family, peer group, school, work) present in a system as well as the values within the system. When the socialising agencies are well defined and structured you find a restricted code. Conversely, where the agencies are malleable, an elaborated code is found. In a society which values individuality you find elaborated codes, and in a narrower society you find restricted codes (Littlejohn, 2002). According to Bernstein (1971), “The orientation towards these codes may be governed entirely by the form of the social relation, or more generally by the quality of the social structure” (p. 135).

Bernstein suggests a correlation between social class and the use of either elaborated or restricted code. He argues that in the working class you are likely to find the use of the restricted code, whereas in the middle class you find the use of both the restricted and elaborated codes. His research suggests that the working class individuals have access only to restricted codes, the ones they learned in the socialisation process, where “both the values and role systems reinforce restricted codes” (Littlejohn, 2002 hhg). However, the middle class, being more geographically, socially and culturally mobile has access to both the restricted codes and elaborated codes. (Atherton, 2002). The restricted code is less formal with shorter phrases interjected into the middle or end of a thought to confirm understanding. For example, “you know”, “you know what I mean”, “right?” and “don’t you think?” Elaborated codes have a longer, more complicated sentence structure that uses uncommon words and thoughts. In the elaborated code there is no padding or filler, only complete, well laid out thoughts that require no previous knowledge on the part of the listener, i.e., necessary details will be provided. According to Bernstein (1971), a working class person communicates in restricted code as a result of the conditions in which they were raised and the socialisation process. The same is true for the middle class person with the exception that they were exposed to the elaborated code as well. Both groups use restricted code at some point, for as Atherton (2002) points out, “Everyone uses restricted code communication some of the time. It would be a very peculiar and cold family which did not have its own language.”

[The correlation between societal class and language codes shown herein explains for the poor performance in language based subjects by the working class students mentioned earlier.]

Though Bernstein's sociolinguistic work on 'restricted code' and 'elaborated code' is widely known it represents only his very earliest work. This early work was the subject of considerable misunderstanding and controversy. Bernstein emphasised that 'code' was not dialect and that code theory was neither a bourgeois alibi for middle-class speech nor a denigrating deficit account of working-class language.

The concept of elaborated and restricted codes has come under criticism. The dichotomy between elaborated and restricted codes actually holds multiple distinct oppositions, such an implicit/explicit, personal/impersonal, and universal vs context-specific meanings, which aren't always correlated. Code choice, rather than lack of a code among some speakers, was found to be important, as was the power imbalance between interviewers and working-class or minority children. Critics have pointed out that academic communication, even in the industrialized West, is heavily reliant on shared background information. Meanwhile, ethnographic studies showed how Western-style schools, far from being decontextualized and suited for an autonomous code, have strong linguistic and interactional expectations.

Code theory in sociology of education
Bernstein's "code theory" in the sociology of education has undergone considerable development since the early 1970s and now enjoys a growing influence in both education and linguistics, especially among systemic functional linguistics. Maton & Muller (2007) describe how Bernstein argued that different positions within society, understood in terms of their degree of specialisation, have different language use patterns that influence the ability of these groups to succeed in schools. These social positions create, as he later put it, 'different modalities of communication differentially valued by the school, and differentially effective in it, because of the school's values, modes of practice and relations with its different communities' (1996: 91). The notion was codified first in terms of "classification" and "framing", where classification conceptualises relations of power that regulate relations between contexts or categories, and framing conceptualises relations of control within these contexts or categories (1975). These concepts have been widely used to analyse educational contexts and practices and their relations to the dispositions (or coding orientation) brought to education by different social groups.

These concepts raised the question of how different forms of educational knowledge are constructed. Bernstein pointed to the pedagogic device as the cause (see Maton & Muller 2007). This forms the basis of his account of:
 the ordered regulation and distribution of a society's worthwhile knowledge store (ordered by a set of distributive rules);
 its transformation into a pedagogic discourse, a form amenable to pedagogic transmission (ordered by a specifiable set of recontextualising rules); and
 the further transformation of this pedagogic discourse into a set of criterial standards to be attained (ordered by a specifiable set of evaluative rules).

In Bernstein's conceptualisation each of these rules is associated with a specific field of activity:
 a field of production where ‘new’ knowledge is constructed and positioned;
 a field of recontextualisation where discourses from the field of production are selected, appropriated and repositioned to become ‘educational’ knowledge; and
 a field of reproduction where pedagogic practice takes place.

Together these three rules and their associated fields constitute an ‘arena’ of conflict and struggle created by the pedagogic device in which social groups attempt to dominate how educational knowledge is constructed:

Groups attempt to appropriate the device to impose their rule by the construction of particular code modalities. Thus the device or apparatus becomes the focus of challenge, resistance and conflict
(Bernstein 1996: 193). 

As Moore & Maton (2001) describe, having analysed the nature of educational knowledge, and then how knowledge is selected from fields of knowledge production and then rearranged and recontextualised to become educational knowledge, the next question is: what characterises the nature of these fields of knowledge production? Bernstein conceptualises these in terms of 'knowledge structures'. Bernstein defines a "hierarchical knowledge structure" as ‘a coherent, explicit and systematically principled structure, hierarchically organised’ which ‘attempts to create very general propositions and theories, which integrate knowledge at lower levels, and in this way shows underlying uniformities across an expanding range of apparently different phenomena’ (1999: 161, 162), such as physics. A "horizontal knowledge structure" is defined as ‘a series of specialised languages with specialised modes of interrogation and criteria for the construction and circulation of texts’ (1999: 162), such as each of the disciplines of the humanities and social sciences.

Works
 Class, Codes and Control: Volume 1 – Theoretical Studies Towards A Sociology Of Language (1971)
 Class, Codes and Control: Volume 2 – Applied Studies Towards A Sociology Of Language (1973)
 Selection and Control – Teachers' Ratings of Children in the Infant School (1974) with Walter Brandis
 Class, Codes and Control: Volume 3 – Towards A Theory Of Educational Transmissions (1975; 1977 second edition)
 Class, Codes and Control: Volume 4 – The Structuring Of Pedagogic Discourse (1990)
 Social Class, Language And Communication with Dorothy Henderson
 Pedagogy, Symbolic Control and Identity (1996; 2000 second edition)

References

Sources
 Atkinson, P. (1985) Language, Structure and Reproduction: An introduction to the sociology of Basil Bernstein. London, Methuen.
 Atkinson, P., Delamont, S. & Davies, B. (1995) (eds) Discourse and Reproduction: Essays in honour of Basil Bernstein. Cresskill, NJ, Hampton Press.
 Christie, F. (1999) (ed) Pedagogy and the Shaping of Consciousness: Linguistic and social processes. London, Continuum.
 Christie, F. & Martin, J. (2007) (eds) Language, Knowledge and Pedagogy: Functional linguistic and sociological perspectives. London, Continuum.
 Maton, K. (2000) Recovering pedagogic discourse: A Bernsteinian approach to the sociology of educational knowledge, Linguistics & Education 11 (1), 79–98.
 Maton, K. & Muller, J. (2007) A sociology for the transmission of knowledges, in Christie, F. & Martin, J. (eds) Language, Knowledge and Pedagogy. London, Continuum, 14–33.
 Moore, R., Arnot, M., Beck, J. & Daniels, H. (eds) (2006) Knowledge, Power and Educational Reform: Applying the sociology of Basil Bernstein. London, Routledge.
 Moore, R. & Maton, K. (2001) Founding the sociology of knowledge: Basil Bernstein, intellectual fields and the epistemic device, in Morais, A., Neves, I., Davies, B. & Daniels, H. (Eds.) Towards a Sociology of Pedagogy. New York, Peter Lang, 153–182.
 Moore, R. (2012), Basil Bernstein: The Thinker and the Field, London, Routledge.
 Morais, A., Neves, I., Davies, B. & Daniels, H. (2001) (eds) Towards a Sociology of Pedagogy: The contribution of Basil Bernstein to research. New York, Peter Lang.
 Muller, J., Davies, B. & Morais, A. (2004) (eds) Reading Bernstein, Researching Bernstein. London, RoutledgeFalmer.
 Sadovnik, A.R. (ed) (1995) Knowledge and Pedagogy: The sociology of Basil Bernstein. Norwood, NJ, Ablex
 Singh, Parlo (2020). Basil Bernstein, Code Theory, and Education: Women's Contributions. London, Routledge.

Primary sources
The personal papers of Basil Bernstein are held in Archives of the Institute of Education, University of London .

External links
 Institute obituary notice
 "Basil Bernstein’s Sociolinguistic Theory of Language Codes" by R. Young Spring 2002
 Basil Bernstein, Bibliography

1924 births
2000 deaths
British Jews
Linguists from the United Kingdom
British sociologists
Jewish scientists
Alumni of University College London
Sociolinguists
Sociologists of education
20th-century linguists